The Treasurer of the Chamber was at various points a position in the British royal household.

13th century
The post of Treasurer of the Chamber first arose in the early 13th century. As part of the evolutionary changes that saw the Treasurer of the Exchequer become an office of state outside the King's Household, one of the Chamber Clerks took on responsibility for financial matters within the Household. The Treasurer of the Chamber had oversight of the Clerks (keepers) of the Wardrobe, among other duties; but in 1232 the office was merged into that of Keeper of the Wardrobe, being one of a number of offices held by Peter Des Rivaux; his successors were known interchangeably as Keepers or Treasurers of the Wardrobe, and the post survives today in the sinecure of Treasurer of the Household.

14th century
In the reign of Edward II the influence of the Wardrobe diminished, and the Chamber regained its place of seniority within the Household. In order to enable the Chamber to serve as a source of funds for the monarch, income from certain lands confiscated by the Crown (namely those of Walter Langton and of the Knights Templar) were directed into the Chamber, one of whose Clerks took responsibility for their receipt. A generation later, under Edward III, this official had the title Receiver of the Chamber, but was also referred to as the Treasurer of the Chamber. The Receiver tended to function as the executive head of the Chamber at this time, working under the titular head, the King's Chamberlain. In the 1330s-50s three Receivers held concurrently the offices of Keeper of the Mint and Keeper of the Privy Wardrobe, both at the Tower of London. The Privy Wardrobe was linked to the Chamber as a safe repository of jewels, plate and other treasures, as well as of arms, armour and artillery pieces.

In the 1350s moves were made which saw the Chamber lands and their incomes transferred to the Exchequer. Subsequently the role of the Receiver diminished. The post then went into abeyance for a time; when it was revived, its main focus was on custody of certain jewels and gold and silver vessels. In the last decade of the century, under Richard II, the office was again united with that of Keeper of the Privy Wardrobe in the person of John Lowick.

15th-18th centuries
With the Privy Wardrobe specialising in armaments, a dedicated Jewel Office was set up in the early 15th century. The Black Book of Edward IV of England lists its chief officer as 'Keeper of the King's Jewels and Treasurer of the Chamber'.
 
In 1485 the office of Treasurer of the Chamber was separated from that of the Master of the Jewel Office, situated within the Privy Chamber department of the Lord Steward. It became an important office of finance established by King Henry VII (1485-1509) to administer his new secretive and highly efficient system identified and named "Chamber Finance" by 20th-century historians, which sought to mirror the operation of the Exchequer, which was inefficient and subject to parliamentary overview. The office was abolished in 1782.

List of Treasurers of the Chamber

Treasurer of the Chamber
 Luke the Chaplain 1225-1228 (later Archdeacon of Norwich and Archbishop of Dublin)
 Ranulf the Breton 1228-1231
 Peter of Rivaux 1231-1234
From 1232 this office was united with that of Keeper of the Wardrobe.

Receiver (or Treasurer) of the Chamber
 Ingelard Warley (before 1309) (also Keeper of the Wardrobe)
 Roger Wingfield ?1309-1314 
 Richard Squire 1314-1317 
 Robert Appleby 1314-1315
 John Peacock 1314-1319
 Richard Lusteshull 1315-1321
 James of Spain ?1321-1322
 William Langley 1322-1326
 Thomas Gargrave 1330
 Richard de Bury 1331 (Bishop of Durham)
 John Fleet 1333-1334 (also Keeper of the Privy Wardrobe)
 William Trussell 1333-1335 (son of Sir William Trussell)
 William Kilsby 1335-1338
 Thomas Hatfield 1338-1344 (afterwards Bishop of Durham)
 Robert Burton 1344-1349
 Robert Mildenhall 1346-1353 (also Keeper of the Privy Wardrobe)
 Thomas Bramber 1347-1349
 Richard Norwich 1349-1355
 William Rothwell 1353-1355 (also Keeper of the Privy Wardrobe)
 William of Wykeham ?1355-1361 (later Bishop of Winchester)
 Helming Leget 1362-1375 (Constable of Windsor Castle)
 William Gambon 1375-1376
 Philip de la Vache 1377-1378
 vacant (Acting Receiver: Simon de Burley)
 Baldwin Raddington 1380-1382
 John Salesbury 1382
 Richard Abberbury 1382
 John Bacon 1382-1384
 John Beauchamp 1384-1387
 John Golafre 1387
 Lambert Fermer 1387-1391
 Guy Mone 1391-1398 (Bishop of St Davids)
 John Lowick 1398-1399  (also Keeper of the Privy Wardrobe)

Keeper of the King's Jewels and Treasurer of the Chamber
 William Pilton 1405–1407  (Archdeacon of York)
 Sir John Merston 1445–1448
 Richard Merston 1453–1456
 William Grimsby 1456-1461
 William Porte 1461-1465
 Thomas Vaughan 1465-1483
 Edmund Chaderton 1484-1485

Treasurer of the Chamber
Sir Thomas Lovell 1485–1492
Sir John Heron 1492–1521
John Myclo 1521-1522
Henry Wyatt 1524–1528
Brian Tuke 1528–1545
Sir Anthony Rous 1545–1546
Sir William Cavendish 1546–?1558
John Mason 1558–1566
Sir Francis Knollys 1567–1570
Sir Thomas Heneage 1570–1595
John Stanhope, 1st Baron Stanhope 1596–1616
Sir William Uvedale 1618-1642
Interregnum 1649-1660
Sir Edward Griffin 1660–1679
Edward Griffin 1679–1689
Sir Rowland Gwynne 1689–1692
vacant
Lord Edward Russell 1694–1702
John Berkeley, 4th Viscount Fitzhardinge 1702–1712
John West, 6th Baron De La Warr 1713–1714
Charles Robartes, 2nd Earl of Radnor 1714–1720
Henry Pelham 1720–1722
Charles Stanhope 1722–1727
John Hobart, 1st Baron Hobart 1727–1744
Sir John Hynde Cotton, 3rd Baronet 1744–1746
Hon. Richard Arundell 1746–1755
Wills Hill, 1st Earl of Hillsborough 1755–1756
Charles Townshend 1756–1761
Sir Francis Dashwood, Bt 1761–1762
Sir Gilbert Elliot, 3rd Baronet 1762–1770
George Rice 1770–1779
Lord Charles Spencer 1779–1782

See also
History of the English fiscal system

Sources
Treasurers of the Chamber 1660–1782

Richardson, W.C., Tudor Chamber Administration 1485-1547, Baton Rouge Louisiana, 1952.

References

Positions within the British Royal Household
1782 disestablishments in Great Britain